General elections were held in Paraguay on 21 April 2013. They resulted in a victory for the Colorado Party, which had ruled the country for 60 years before losing power in 2008. The presidential elections were won by the Colorado Party's Horacio Cartes, who defeated Efraín Alegre of the Paraguay Alegre alliance. The Colorado Party also won the most seats in the Senate and Chamber of Deputies.

Background

In the previous general elections in 2008 Fernando Lugo was elected President. However, he was controversially impeached and removed from office in a 48-hour period in June 2012, following an eviction at a farm that led to the death of six police and eleven farmers. Lugo was replaced by his vice-president Federico Franco. Following the impeachment, Paraguay was suspended from Mercosur and Unasur, who denounced the impeachment as a Congressional coup.

Franco was barred from running for a full term in 2013. The Constitution of Paraguay does not allow a president to run for reelection, even if he serves a partial term.

Candidates
Eleven candidates contested the presidential election:

Coalitions formed for the election included the:

 Forward Country (Avanza País), a centre-left alliance including, amongst others, the Revolutionary Febrerista Party and the Christian Democratic Party.

 Frente Guasú, a left-wing alliance including, amongst others, the Party for a Country of Solidarity and the Paraguayan Communist Party.

 Paraguay Alegre (lit. Happy Paraguay, alluding to their candidate's name), a centrist alliance including, amongst others, the Authentic Radical Liberal Party, the Democratic Progressive Party and the National Encounter Party.

On the night of 2 February 2013, Lino Oviedo Silva, the candidate of the right-wing National Union of Ethical Citizens, died in a helicopter accident near Puerto Antequera, in the Chaco region. His death was confirmed the following day, when the national police rescue team found the three burnt corpses of Oviedo, the plane's pilot, and a bodyguard. His candidacy was taken over by his nephew Lino Oviedo Sánchez.

Campaign
Reporters without Borders said in April 2013 that "Paraguay continues to be a dangerous country for journalists, in part because of the links between politics and organized crime, which were widely criticized during the campaign." It noted that two television stations (the public TV Pública and private Canal 9 SNT) had refused to air a Frente Guasú campaign ad highlighting the role of candidates Cartes and Alegre in the impeachment of Fernando Lugo.

During the campaign Cartes made homophobic statements, comparing homosexuals to monkeys and saying he would shoot himself in the testicles if his son turned out to be gay.

Opinion polls

Results

President

Senate

Elected Senators

Source: Justicia Electoral

Chamber of Deputies

Elected Deputies

Source: Justicia Electoral

Reactions 
The defeated candidate Alegre conceded to Cartes a short time after preliminary results were announced. Argentine president Cristina Fernández de Kirchner congratulated the Paraguayan people, describing the election as "exemplary" and announced her endorsement of a re-admission of the country to the Mercosur community. José Mujica, the president of Uruguay, congratulated Cartes as well and invited him to the Mercosur summit that is to take place in his country in June. The European Union's high representative for foreign affairs, Catherine Ashton lauded the high turn-out, orderly and calm conduct of the election. Among the first felicitators was also Venezuelan president Nicolás Maduro.

References

2013 in Paraguay
Paraguay
Elections in Paraguay
Presidential elections in Paraguay
April 2013 events in South America